Daryl Maurice Porter (born January 16, 1974) is a former professional American football safety in the National Football League (NFL). He played five seasons for the Detroit Lions (1997), the Buffalo Bills (1998–2000), and the Tennessee Titans (2001).

1974 births
Living people
Players of American football from Fort Lauderdale, Florida
Porter, Daryl
American football safeties
Boston College Eagles football players
Detroit Lions players
Buffalo Bills players
Tennessee Titans players